The Waldach is a river of Baden-Württemberg, southwestern Germany. It is a right tributary of the river Nagold in the town Nagold.

References

Rivers of Baden-Württemberg
Nagold
Rivers of Germany